Einsatzgruppen (German for "task forces", "deployment groups"; singular Einsatzgruppe; official full name Einsatzgruppen der Sicherheitspolizei und des SD) were Schutzstaffel (SS) paramilitary death squads of Nazi Germany that were responsible for mass killings, primarily by shooting, during World War II. The Einsatzgruppen had a leading role in the implementation of the Final Solution of the Jewish question (Die Endlösung der Judenfrage) in territories conquered by Nazi Germany.

Under the direction of Reichsführer-SS Heinrich Himmler and the supervision of SS-Obergruppenführer Reinhard Heydrich, the Einsatzgruppen operated in territories occupied by the German armed forces following the invasion of Poland in September 1939 and Operation Barbarossa (the invasion of the Soviet Union) in June 1941. Historian Raul Hilberg estimates that between 1941 and 1945 the Einsatzgruppen and related agencies and foreign auxiliary personnel killed more than two million people, including 1.3 million Jews. The total number of Jews murdered during the Holocaust is estimated at 5.5 to six million people.

After the close of the World War II, 24 senior leaders of the Einsatzgruppen were prosecuted in the Einsatzgruppen Trial in 1947–48, charged with crimes against humanity and war crimes. Fourteen death sentences and two life sentences were among the judgements. Four additional Einsatzgruppe leaders were later tried and executed by other nations.

Invasion of Poland 
Seven Einsatzgruppen of battalion strength operated in Poland. Each was subdivided into four Einsatzkommandos of company strength.

 Einsatzgruppe I, commanded by SS-Standartenführer Bruno Streckenbach, acted with 14th Army
 Einsatzgruppe II, SS-Obersturmbannführer Emanuel Schäfer, acted with 10th Army
 Einsatzgruppe III, SS-Obersturmbannführer und Regierungsrat Dr. Herbert Fischer, acted with 8th Army
 Einsatzgruppe IV, SS-Brigadeführer Lothar Beutel, acted with 4th Army
 Einsatzgruppe V, SS-Standartenfürer Ernst Damzog, acted with 3rd Army
 Einsatzgruppe VI, SS-Oberführer Erich Naumann, acted in Wielkopolska
 Einsatzgruppe VII, SS-Obergruppenführer Udo von Woyrsch and SS-Gruppenführer Otto Rasch, acted in Upper Silesia and Cieszyn Silesia

Invasion of the Soviet Union and other countries

References

Bibliography